Geneva National Golf Club is a golf course resort in Lake Geneva, Wisconsin. It opened in 1991.

From 2006 to 2008, it hosted the Aurora Health Care Championship.

It has three courses, designed by Arnold Palmer, Gary Player and Lee Trevino respectively.

Courses
Arnold Palmer Signature Course
Gary Player Signature Course
Lee Trevino Signature Course

References

External links
 Geneva National Resort official website

Golf clubs and courses in Wisconsin
Buildings and structures in Walworth County, Wisconsin
Lake Geneva, Wisconsin
Sports in the Milwaukee metropolitan area